Bogatuanovsky spring (The Rich Well) — a monument of history and nature in the city of Rostov-on-Don on the Bogatuanovsky descent, situated between Sedova Street and Beregovaya Street.

The history and description 

According to the legend, young sir Petr Alekseevich, traveling around the neighborhood with his generals, watched the movement of Russian ships to the shipyard to the mouth of Temernik. Noticing the place, where springs were flowing from the calcareous slope, sir, drinking water from the most deep-water spring, exclaimed:‘’The rich well!’’This place got such a geographical name, when the drafting of the first Russian maps of the territories near the Don River was after the conquest of Azov.

Temernitskaya customs house was founded in 1749 near the Rich well, from which the biography of Rostov-on-Don was started. The spring itself became a reference point , chosen for the geographic attachment in honor of St. Dmitry Rostovsky to the river bank.

Soldiers, officers, inhabitants of the fortress and inhabitants of the nearest settlement Poludenka used the well water.

The spring was on a slope near the artillery pier; from it people made underground passage in the central part of the fortress, from which the water barrels were delivered.

Then, the spring, which called Bogatuanovsky spring, supplied water to the city's quarters in 19 and 20 centuries. The first city plumbing, which began its work in 1860, took water from Bogatuanovsky spring. from the mid-1920s the water from the spring is used only for technical purposes.

Former Bogatuanovsky Avenue and modern Bogatuanovsky descent owe the well for their names.

In the 19th century  with a small stone rotunda, which was changing its appearance, existed until the end of 1990s was built over one of the springs of the Rich well.

In 1998 the spring was declared as a memorable place, which closely connected with the foundation of Rostov-on-Don.

On the eve of the 250th anniversary of Rostov-on-Don, the rotunda and the territory around it were reconstructed using the forms of industrial architecture of the end of 19 century, installed memorial plaque.

References 

Tourist attractions in Rostov-on-Don
Monuments and memorials in Rostov-on-Don
Cultural heritage monuments in Rostov-on-Don
Cultural heritage monuments of regional significance in Rostov Oblast